Dr. Angeline Stoll Lillard is a professor of psychology at the University of Virginia, where she directs the Early Development Laboratory, one of four child development laboratories in the psychology department at the university. Lillard is an internationally recognized expert in Montessori education and the author of Montessori: The Science Behind the Genius, which is in its third edition, has been translated into several languages, and was awarded the Cognitive Development Society Book Award in 2006.

Biography
Dr. Lillard completed her PhD under the supervision of John Flavell at Stanford University in 1991. Her dissertation research, focusing on young children's mental representations of pretend play, was awarded theAmerican Psychological Association's Outstanding Dissertation Award of 1992, and later the Boyd McCandless Award for early contributions to developmental science.

Lillard began her career in academia at the University of San Francisco, where she served as assistant professor of psychology from 1991 to 1995. She was then awarded funding by the National Science Foundation to serve as a visiting professor of psychology at University of California, Berkeley for one year. At the conclusion of that role, Dr. Lillard moved to the University of Virginia, where she has remained since.

Lillard is author of Montessori: The Science Behind the Genius, 3rd edition. Her scientific work has appeared in journals such as the Psychological Bulletin, Science, Pediatrics, and Psychological Science, and has been featured in popular press outlets including Nightline, The Washington Post, Forbes, and Slate. Lillard is a frequent keynote speaker at psychology, Montessori, and education conferences nationally and internationally.

Research
Lillard's primary research interests include Montessori education and children's pretend play. She is also interested in the development of theory of mind, children's executive function, children and media, neuroplasticity, contemplative practices, and culture and development. Her research has been funded by sources like the National Institutes of Health, National Science Foundation, Institute for Educational Sciences, and the Wildflower Foundation Research Partner Grant.

Honors and awards 

 UVA Research Achievement Award, 2021
 University of Virginia College Fellow, 2021-2024
 Fellow, American Association for the Advancement of Science, 2020
 Public Voices Fellow, The Op-Ed Project, University of Virginia, 2018–19
 Fellow, American Psychological Association, 2011
 Cognitive Development Society Book Award, 2006, for Montessori: The Science Behind the Genius
 Fellow, Association for Psychological Science, 2006
 James McKeen Cattell Sabbatical Fellow, 2005-2006
 Life Academy Fellow (Max Planck-Berlin, Universities of Michigan, Virginia, Zurich, Humboldt, and Frei University-Berlin), 2005
 British Psychological Society Visiting Fellow, 2003
 Max Planck Institute for Evolutionary and Cultural Psychology, Leipzig, Visiting Fellow, 2003
 University Teaching Fellow, University of Virginia, 1999-2000
 American Psychological Association Boyd McCandless Young Scientist Award, 1999
 Visiting Scientist, Japan Developmental Psychology Society, Tokyo, 1998
 American Psychological Association Outstanding Dissertation Award (Division 7), 1992

Bibliography

Book
Lillard authored Montessori: The Science Behind the Genius, presently in its 3rd edition (2017). The book has been translated into languages including Chinese, Vietnamese, French and Turkish. It was awarded the Cognitive Development Society Book Award in 2006.

In her book, Lillard presents Montessori's theoretical principles, the scientific research that has followed them, and how they are implemented in a Montessori classroom, she also highlights research concerning eight insights that are foundational to Montessori education and describes how each of these insights is applied in the Montessori classroom.

Publications 

 Lillard AS, Taggart J, Yonas D, Seale MN. An alternative to "no excuses": Considering Montessori as culturally responsive pedagogy. Journal of Negro Education. In Press.
 Lillard AS, Tong X, Snyder A. Standardized test performance in public Montessori schools. Journal of School Choice. 2022.
 Lillard AS, Meyer MJ, Vasc D, Fukuda E. An association between Montessori education in  childhood and adult wellbeing. 2021.
 Lillard A, Heise M, Richey E, Tong X, Hart A, Bray P. Montessori preschool elevates and equalizes child outcomes: A longitudinal study. Frontiers in psychology. 2017;8:1783.
 Lillard A, Else-Quest N. The early years: Evaluating Montessori education. Science.2006;313(5795):1893–1894.

For a complete and current list, visit the publications page of the University of Virginia Early Development Lab

References

External links
 University of Virginia, Psychology Department 
 University of Virginia Early Development Lab
Angeline S. Lillard 
Angeline S. Lillard AMI Associate General Meeting, Amsterdam 
Lillard interviewed by Bob Greenberg for the 

Year of birth missing (living people)
Living people
Montessori education
University of Virginia faculty
21st-century American psychologists
Smith College alumni
Stanford University alumni